Juan Manuel González Limón (born 11 January 1994) is a Spanish male volleyball player. He is part of the Spain men's national volleyball team. On club level he plays for Unicaja Almería.

References

External links
Profile at FIVB.org

1994 births
Living people
Spanish men's volleyball players
Sportspeople from Huelva
Spanish expatriate sportspeople in Italy
Expatriate volleyball players in Italy
Blu Volley Verona players